The year 1722 in architecture involved some significant events.

Buildings and structures

Buildings

 Blenheim Palace (begun 1705) in Woodstock, England, designed by John Vanbrugh, is completed.
 Wanstead House, near London, England, designed by Colen Campbell, is completed.
 Castletown House in County Kildare, Ireland, designed by Alessandro Galilei, is completed.
 Kantajew Temple in Bengal is completed.

Awards
 Grand Prix de Rome: Jean-Michel Chevotet.

Births
 March 17 – William Wentworth, 2nd Earl of Strafford, English peer and amateur architect (died 1791)
 August – James Essex, English builder and architect working in Cambridge (died 1784)
 Robert Smith, Scottish architect working in America (died 1777)

Deaths
 June 20 – Christoph Dientzenhofer, Bavarian baroque architect working in Bohemia (born 1655)
 William Winde, English gentleman architect (born c.1640)

References

architecture
Years in architecture
18th-century architecture